BREEAM (Building Research Establishment Environmental Assessment Method), first published by the Building Research Establishment (BRE) in 1990, is the world's longest established method of assessing, rating, and certifying the sustainability of buildings.  More than 550,000 buildings have been 'BREEAM-certified' and over two million are registered for certification in more than 50 countries worldwide. BREEAM also has a tool which focuses on neighbourhood development.

Purpose
BREEAM is an assessment undertaken by independent licensed assessors using scientifically-based sustainability metrics and indices which cover a range of environmental issues. Its categories evaluate energy and water use, health and wellbeing, pollution, transport, materials, waste, ecology and management processes. Buildings are rated and certified on a scale of 'Pass', 'Good', 'Very Good', 'Excellent' and 'Outstanding'.

It works to raise awareness amongst owners, occupiers and designers of the benefits of taking a sustainable approach, providing a framework to help them to successfully adopt sustainable solutions in a cost-effective manner, and provides market recognition of their achievements. It aims to reduce the negative effects of construction and development on the environment.

History
Work on creating BREEAM began at the Building Research Establishment (based in Watford, England) in 1988. The first version for assessing new office buildings was launched in 1990. This was followed by versions for other buildings including superstores, industrial units and existing offices.

In 1998, there was a major revamp of the BREEAM Offices standard, and the scheme's layout, with features such as weighting for different sustainability issues, was established. The development of BREEAM then accelerated with annual updates and variations for other building types such as retail premises being introduced.

A version of BREEAM for new homes called EcoHomes was launched in 2000. This scheme was later used as the basis of the Code for Sustainable Homes, which was developed by BRE for the UK Government in 2006/7 and replaced Eco Homes in England and Wales. In 2014, the Government in England signalled the winding down the Code for Sustainable Homes. Since then BRE has developed the Home Quality Mark, which is part of the BREEAM family of schemes. 

An extensive update of all BREEAM schemes in 2008 resulted in the introduction of mandatory post-construction reviews, minimum standards and innovation credits. International versions of BREEAM were also launched that year.

Another major update in 2011 resulted in the launch of BREEAM New Construction, which is now used to assess and certify all new UK buildings. This revision included the reclassification and consolidation of issues and criteria to further streamline the BREEAM process. In 2012, a scheme for domestic refurbishment was introduced in the UK, followed by a non-domestic version in 2014 that was expanded to an international scope the following year.

In 2015, the Building Research Establishment announced the acquisition of CEEQUAL following a recommendation from their board, with the aim of creating a single sustainability rating scheme for civil engineering and infrastructure projects.

The latest update of BREEAM UK New Construction was launched in March 2018 at Ecobuild.

Scope
BREEAM has expanded from its original focus on individual new buildings at the construction stage to encompass the whole life cycle of buildings from planning to in-use and refurbishment. Its regular revisions and updates are driven by the ongoing need to improve sustainability, respond to feedback from industry and support the UK's sustainability strategies and commitments.

Highly flexible, the BREEAM standard can be applied to virtually any building and location, with versions for new buildings, existing buildings, refurbishment projects and large developments:

BREEAM New Construction is the BREEAM standard against which the sustainability of new, non-residential buildings in the UK is assessed. Developers and their project teams use the scheme at key stages in the design and procurement process to measure, evaluate, improve and reflect the performance of their buildings.

BREEAM International New Construction is the BREEAM standard for assessing the sustainability of new residential and non-residential buildings in countries around the world, except for the UK and other countries with a national BREEAM scheme (see below). This scheme makes use of assessment criteria that take account of the circumstances, priorities, codes and standards of the country or region in which the development is located.

BREEAM In-Use is a scheme to help building managers reduce the running costs and improve the environmental performance of existing buildings. It has two parts: building asset and building management. Both parts are relevant to all non-domestic, commercial, industrial, retail and institutional buildings. BREEAM In-Use is widely used by members of the International Sustainability Alliance (ISA), which provides a platform for certification against the scheme. The newest version v6, available from 2020 includes also Residential programs.

BREEAM Refurbishment provides a design and assessment method for sustainable housing refurbishment projects, helping to cost-effectively improve the sustainability and environmental performance of existing dwellings in a robust way. A scheme for non-housing refurbishment projects is being developed and is targeted for launch in early 2014. The launch date will be announced once the piloting and independent peer review processes has been completed.

BREEAM Communities focuses on the masterplanning of whole communities. It is aimed at helping construction industry professionals to design places that people want to live and work in, are good for the environment and are economically successful.

BREEAM includes several general sustainability categories for the assessment:
 Management
 Energy
 Health and wellbeing
 Transport
 Water
 Materials
 Waste
 Land use and ecology
 Pollution

Home Quality Mark was launched in 2015 as part of the BREEAM family of schemes. It rates new homes on their overall quality and sustainability, then provides further indicators on the homes impact upon the occupants 'Running costs', 'Health and wellbeing' and 'Environmental footprint'.

National operators
BREEAM is used in more than 70 countries, with several in Europe having gone a stage further to develop country-specific BREEAM schemes operated by National Scheme Operators (NSOs). There are currently NSOs affiliated to BREEAM in:

 Netherlands: the Dutch Green Building Council operates BREEAM NL
 Spain: the Instituto Tecnológico de Galicia operates BREEAM ES
 Norway: the Norwegian Green Building Council operates BREEAM NOR
 Sweden: the Swedish Green Building Council operates BREEAM SE
 Germany: the German Institute for Sustainable Real Estate (DIFNI) operates BREEAM DE.

Schemes developed by NSOs can take any format as long as they comply with a set of overarching requirements laid down in the Code for a Sustainable Built Environment. They can be produced from scratch by adapting current BREEAM schemes to the local context, or by developing existing local schemes.

The cost and value of sustainability
A growing body of research evidence is challenging the perception that sustainable buildings are significantly more costly to design and build than those that simply adhere to regulatory requirements. Research by the Sweett Group into projects using BREEAM, for example, demonstrates that sustainable options often add little or no capital cost to a development project. Where such measures do incur additional costs, these can frequently be paid back through lower running expenses, ultimately leading to saving over the life of the building.

Research studies have also highlighted the enhanced value and quality of sustainable buildings. Achieving the standards required by BREEAM requires careful planning, design, specification and detailing, and a good working relationship between the client and project team—the very qualities that can produce better buildings and better conditions for building users. A survey commissioned by Schneider Electric and undertaken by BSRIA examined the experiences of a wide range of companies that had used BREEAM. The findings included, for example, that 88% think it is a good thing, 96% would use the scheme again and 88% would recommend BREEAM to others.

The greater efficiency and quality associated with sustainability are also helping to make such building more commercially successful. There is growing evidence, for example, that BREEAM-rated buildings provide increased rates of return for investors, and increased rental rates and sales premiums for developers and owners. A Maastricht University document, published by RICS Research, reported on a study of the effect of BREEAM certification on office buildings in London from 2000–2009. It found, for example, that these buildings achieved a 21% premium on transaction prices and an 18% premium on rents.

See also
LEED (Leadership in Energy and Environmental Design)
Sustainable refurbishment

References

External links
 BREEAM website
 
 Website of the Building Research Establishment

Building energy rating
Building engineering
Construction
Environmental design
Environmental engineering
Low-energy building in the United Kingdom
Science and technology in Hertfordshire
Sustainability
Sustainable building in the United Kingdom
Sustainable building rating systems
Sustainable design
Sustainable development